The Men's synchronized 10 metre platform competition at the 2022 World Aquatics Championships was held on 28 June 2022.

Results
The preliminary round was started on 28 June at 10:00. 
The final was started on 28 June at 19:00.

Green denotes finalists

References

Men's synchronized 10 metre platform